"Martian Hop" is a song written by The Ran-Dells, and released in 1963.  It has been described as a one-hit wonder novelty song and reached #27 on the black singles chart and #16 on the Billboard Hot 100.  The song was later covered by artists as diverse as Rocky Sharpe and the Replays, Joanie Bartels and soul group The Newcomers.  Versions in French included comedian Henri Salvador and the group Les Champions.

Creation
The song is the product of the three band members joking around in John Spirt's living room at his residence in Wildwood, New Jersey.  It tells of Martians throwing a dance party for "all the human race," and "theorized Martians were probably great dancers." It is one of many songs recorded during the 1950s and 1960s that capitalized on space exploration and the possibility of threatening aliens.  While Steve Rappaport worked on the song in the studio, Gerry Goffin heard it and recommended to Don Kirshner it be picked up and released on the new label, Chairman. The master tape cost over $300 and "Martian Hop" became the third single Chairman released.

Early electronic music 
Though the Ran-Dells have been recognized for innovative and pioneering use of a sine wave generator (a first for the pop music genre), the musicians actually responsible for the sine wave tones heard in "Martian Hop" received no credit for the composition. The twelve-second introduction at the beginning of the song is an uncredited sample from the first 30 seconds of "Moon Maid" by Tom Dissevelt and Dick Raaymakers, aka Kid Baltan. It appeared on their experimental album, The Electrosoniks - Electronic Music in 1962, a year before "Martian Hop" was recorded.

Chart positions 
The Ran-Dells

Rocky Sharpe and the Replays version

See also 
 List of 1960s one-hit wonders in the United States

References

External links
 The Martian ( Hop ) Chronicles - The Story of the Ran-Dells
 Way Back Attack - The Ran-Dells "Martian Hop"
 Le Martien (The Martian Hop) Henri Salvador

1963 singles
Novelty songs
1963 songs
Songs about dancing
Songs about extraterrestrial life
Songs about planets
Fiction set on Mars